Vincent Guignery (born 18 August 1978 in Sainte-Adresse, Seine-Maritime) is a French retired footballer who played as a left-back. He previously played professionally in Ligue 2 for FC Martigues and also represented a number of other clubs, including Libourne-Saint-Seurin, Boulogne, Chamois Niortais and RC Strasbourg.

Career

Early career 
Guignery began his senior career in 1999 playing for FC Libourne-Saint-Seurin in the Championnat de France amateur, the fourth tier of the French football league system. Guignery played 57 league games in his two seasons with Libourne, helping the team to consecutive 5th-placed and 11th-placed finishes.

At the end of that season, Guignery's contract came to an end and he was released by Libourne. His performances in the CFA had attracted bigger clubs, and in the summer of 2001 he signed for Ligue 2 side Martigues.

Martigues 
Guignery found his first team opportunities limited in a higher division, making just 9 league appearances as the team ended the season bottom of the division, nine points adrift from safety. On their return to the Championnat National, the club finished fifth in the league. Guignery made only four more appearances for Martigues and his contract came to an end following the 2002–03 season, and he signed for another CFA side, US Boulogne.

Boulogne 
In his first season with Boulogne, Guignery played 31 league games as the team finished the season in 11th position. In Guignery's second season, the team finished top of the CFA Group A by two points, winning promotion to the Championnat National. The team also managed to reach the quarter-finals of the Coupe de France.

In the club's first season back in the National division, they achieved a comfortable 6th-placed finish with Guignery playing 28 games in the league. In the summer of 2006, Boulogne decided not to renew Guignery's contract and he returned to the CFA, signing for Quevilly.

Quevilly 
Guignery's first season with Quevilly was largely uneventful, with the team securing safety by seven points ahead of Pontivy, finishing 14th in the CFA Group D. For the 2007–08 term the team was moved to the CFA Group A and the season was more successful for the club as they finished 3rd behind Pacy Vallée-d'Eure and FC Rouen, missing out on the league title and promotion by six points. Guignery's performances in the lower leagues had again alerted professional clubs and in July 2008, he signed for Championnat National side AS Beauvais Oise.

Beauvais 
Guignery played 21 league games in his only season with Beauvais as the team cemented a 10th-placed finish in the Championnat National.

Chamois Niortais 
On 6 July 2009, it was announced that he had agreed a one-year contract with Niort, as the club aimed to return to the Championnat National at the first attempt. He went on to play 44 league matches for Niort before leaving at the end of the 2010–11 season.

References

External links 

1978 births
Living people
People from Sainte-Adresse
French footballers
Association football defenders
FC Libourne players
FC Martigues players
US Boulogne players
US Quevilly-Rouen Métropole players
AS Beauvais Oise players
Chamois Niortais F.C. players
RC Strasbourg Alsace players
Ligue 2 players
Championnat National players
Sportspeople from Seine-Maritime